The 2018–19 Lietuvos krepšinio lyga, also called Betsafe-LKL for sponsorship reasons, was the 26th season of the top-tier level professional basketball league of Lithuania, the Lietuvos krepšinio lyga (LKL). The Betsafe LKL championship started on 22 September 2018 and ended on 1 June 2019.

Žalgiris achieved their 21st title overall, ninth consecutive.

Competition format
During the regular season, all teams play 36 games. The top eight teams in the regular season standings, after playing their entire 36 game schedule, qualified for the playoffs in the quarterfinals, that was played in a best-of-three games format. The semifinals were played in best-of-three format.

The final round was be played between the two winners of the semifinals. The finals series, for first place, as also games for third place were played in a best-of-five format.

Teams

Location and arenas

Ten teams were granted licences for the season.

Regular season

League table

Results

Play–offs

Quarterfinals and semifinals were played in a best–of–three games format, while the finals in a best–of–five format.

Bracket

Quarterfinals

|}

Semifinals

|}

Third–place series

|}

Finals

|}

Awards
All official awards of the 2018–19 LKL season.

Regular Season MVP

Source:

LKL Finals Most Valuable Player Award

All-LKL Team

Source:

Player of the week

Player of the month

Player of the playoffs stages

Lithuanian clubs in European competitions

References

External links
 LKL website

 
Lietuvos krepšinio lyga seasons
Lithuanian
LKL
2018 in Lithuanian sport
2019 in Lithuanian sport